José Alcides "Pepe" Moreno Mora (born 10 September 1981) is a retired Colombian footballer.

Career
Pepe Moreno began his career in the youth system of Deportivo Pasto, club with which he made his professional debut in Columbia's first division during the 1999 season. After two years with Pasto he joined América de Cali. While with Cali he helped the club capture Colombian league titles in 2001 and 2002. During this time he appeared in 43 league games and scored 2 goals, used primarily as a reserve.

In 2004 Pepe Moreno joined Millonarios and began to make a name for himself as a goal scorer. While with Millonarios he scored 12 goals in 29 league matches. In 2005, he returns to América de Cali and continues his goal scoring exploits with 18 goals in 42 matches. In 2006, he leaves to Europe, signing with on loan with Dynamo Kyiv. After limited success he returned to South America in January 2007, as Argentina's Club Atlético IndependienteIndependiente moved to acquire him for $900,000 from América de Cali. During this stint with Independiente he scored 4 goals in 19 appearances. In January 2008, the Colombian striker Moreno joined Steaua București on loan from Independiente until the end of the season, with an option to buy for 1,400,000 euros. Moreno has success with Steaua but the club was unable to buy him. After loans to América de Cali in which he was a member of the Finalizacion 2008 championship squad and Juan Aurich, Pepe returned again on loan to Steaua in the winter of 2010 for a half-year. Steaua again had the option to buy him at the end of the season. On his return match with Steaua versus Romanian champions Unirea Urziceni, he assisted on the equalizing goal with a back pass to Pantelis Kapetanos in minute 92, helping Steaua draw away with Unirea, 2–2.

In January 2011 Moreno returned to Colombia, this time on loan to Atlético Huila. During his half season with Huila he scored 3 goals in 11 appearances. Moreno than signed with Once Caldas for the second half of the 2011 Colombian championship. With Once Caldas Pepe Moreno regained his goal scoring form recording 7 goals and 4 assists in 20 matches.

On 1 February 2012 it was announced that Moreno was acquired on loan by New England Revolution in Major League Soccer. Despite this announcement, on February 7, Moreno reportedly publicly stated that he had chosen to remain with Once Caldas instead of reporting to the Revolution. On the 9th New England Revolution President Brian Bilello wrote in an article on the Revolution's website that all necessary paperwork had been filed to complete the loan deal, and that representatives from the team had been attempting to contact Moreno himself for the past few days, but were unable to do so. Shortly thereafter, WUNR's "Deportes y Mas" host Marino Velasquev reported that the Revolution and MLS had sued Moreno for breach on contract. Velasquez added on February 13 that the team was taking the case to FIFA. Moreno would report to the Revolution nearly 7 weeks later, citing visa issues and a "Personal Matter" keeping him from arriving. He scored his only goal for the franchise in a 2–1 defeat to DC United on April 14. In August of that year, after making a total of 7 appearances, Moreno was waived by the club.

International career
In 2006 Moreno played three games for the Colombia national team.

Notes

References

External links

Steauafc.com profile

1981 births
Living people
Colombian footballers
Colombia international footballers
Association football defenders
Categoría Primera A players
Argentine Primera División players
Peruvian Primera División players
Liga I players
Ukrainian Premier League players
Major League Soccer players
Deportivo Pasto footballers
América de Cali footballers
Millonarios F.C. players
FC Dynamo Kyiv players
Club Atlético Independiente footballers
FC Steaua București players
FC Steaua II București players
Juan Aurich footballers
Atlético Huila footballers
Once Caldas footballers
New England Revolution players
La Equidad footballers
Atlético Bucaramanga footballers
Colombian expatriate footballers
Expatriate footballers in Argentina
Expatriate footballers in Peru
Expatriate footballers in Romania
Colombian expatriate sportspeople in Romania
Expatriate footballers in Ukraine
Expatriate soccer players in the United States
Sportspeople from Cauca Department